USS General Burnside was a Steamship acquired by the Union Navy during the American Civil War. She was used by the Navy as a gunboat, and was assigned to patrol waterways in the Confederate South.

Constructed at Wilmington, Delaware, in 1862 

General Burnside, built in 1862 at Wilmington, Delaware, was sold to the U.S. War Department in 1863; chartered by the Union Navy; commissioned 8 August 1864 at Bridgeport, Alabama, Acting Volunteer Lt. H. A. Glassford in command.

Assigned as flagship of the Upper Tennessee River Fleet 
 
General Burnside became flagship of the upper Tennessee River Fleet, Mississippi Squadron, 15 October 1864. Based at Bridgeport, she patrolled the river to Whitesburg, Decatur, and Chattanooga, Tennessee.

Engaging Confederate batteries at Decatur 

On 27 December 1864 she helped repulse Confederate attacks at Decatur. She was hulled several times while exchanging gunfire with Confederate sharpshooters. This gunboat action in concert with Union Army land forces brought about the evacuation of Decatur by the Confederates and left the upper Tennessee region under firm Union control.

Post-war return of General Burnside to the War Department 

The gunboat continued river patrol until 1 June 1865 when she was returned to the War Department at Bridgeport, Alabama.

References 

Ships of the Union Navy
Ships built in Wilmington, Delaware
Steamships of the United States Navy
Gunboats of the United States Navy
American Civil War patrol vessels of the United States
1862 ships